Krikor Agopian is a Canadian-Armenian painter.

Career
He studied commercial, fashion, industrial, and furniture design as a young adult while receiving his education in Canada. He was accepted to Concordia University as a candidate for a degree in electrical engineering thanks to his innovations. After a design course in his major, Agopian was offered an individual exhibition, a rare event for first-year students. On witnessing his work, his professor urged him to switch to fine arts.

Academic formation
 Studio 5316, Montreal, Quebec, Canada  
 Washington School of Fine Arts, Seattle, Washington, United States  
 Concordia University, Montreal, Quebec, Canada

Professor
 Beirut School Of Fine Arts 1972–73, 1978–80  
 Lebanese Academy of Fine Arts 1977-81  
 Institute of Fine Arts, 1981-85 Kaslik

Prizes

 Mention of honner, T.M.A, Beirut 1972  
 Prizes of Excellence, Makhoul, 1980  
 1st prize, Makhoul, 1981  
  
 National Competition of Visual Arts, Montreal, 1990  
2nd Grand Prize, all categories

 National Competition of Visual Arts, Montreal, 1991  
2nd Grand Prize all categories

 Nomination: Prize of Artistic Excellence Laval, 1991
 National Competition of Visual Arts, Montreal, 1996  
3 rd Grand Prize all categories

 International Competition Visual Arts, Montreal, 1997   
1st Prize Abstract.

 International Visual Arts, Montreal, 1998 
1st Trophy • Surrealism

Bibliography
 Participated in numerous international radio and television programs. 
 Multiple works reproduced in many art magazines.

Multiple articles in international magazines:
 Magazine Art International (1991 No.4)
 Parcours (1992 No sept.)
 Marché de l’art Guide vallée (3 e. édition)
 Applied Arts (1990 Vol. 5) etc. 
 Guide de Roussan 2009 etc.

Participated in more than 250 collective exhibition in Canada, United States, Europe and the Middle East.
Agopian's art work can be found in many private and public collections, museums, art societies in Canada, United States, Europe and the Middle East.

Notes

External links
 Krikor Agopian official website
 Agopian
 Agopian Krikor

Living people
Lebanese people of Armenian descent
Lebanese painters
Lebanese emigrants to Canada
Ethnic Armenian painters
Naturalized citizens of Canada
Canadian people of Armenian descent
Canadian painters
Canadian contemporary painters
Year of birth missing (living people)